Henderson City-County Airport  is a public use airport located four nautical miles (7 km) west of the central business district of Henderson, a city in Henderson County, Kentucky, United States. The airport is owned by the City & County of Henderson.

Although most U.S. airports use the same three-letter location identifier for the FAA and IATA, this airport is assigned EHR by the FAA but has no designation from the IATA.

Facilities and aircraft
It has one asphalt paved runway designated 9/27 which measures 5,504 by 100 feet (1,678 x 30 m).

For the 12-month period ending November 17, 2008, the airport had 22,600 aircraft operations, an average of 61 per day: 91% general aviation, 9% air taxi and <1% military. At that time there were 44 aircraft based at this airport: 82% single-engine, 14% multi-engine, 2% jet and 2% helicopter.

References

External links
 Aerial photo as of 6 April 1998 from USGS The National Map
 

Airports in Kentucky
Buildings and structures in Henderson County, Kentucky
Transportation in Henderson County, Kentucky